Felipe Alves may refer to:

 Felipe Alves (footballer, born 1982), Brazilian football defensive midfielder
 Felipe Alves (footballer, born 1988), Brazilian footballer, goalkeeper
 Felipe Alves (footballer, born May 1990), Brazilian footballer
 Felipe Alves (footballer, born November 1990), Brazilian footballer